Rugby Iceland is the governing body for rugby in Iceland. It oversees the various national teams and the development of the sport.

See also
 Rugby union in Iceland

External links
Rugby Iceland

Rugby union in Iceland
Rugby
Rugby union governing bodies in Europe